Odontosyllis is a genus of annelids belonging to the family Syllidae.

The genus has cosmopolitan distribution.

Species:

Odontosyllis annulatus 
Odontosyllis aracaensis 
Odontosyllis arenicolor 
Odontosyllis assimilis
Odontosyllis atypica 
Odontosyllis australiensis 
Odontosyllis brachydonta 
Odontosyllis brevichaetosa 
Odontosyllis brunnea 
Odontosyllis corallicola 
Odontosyllis ctenostoma 
Odontosyllis cucullata 
Odontosyllis detecta 
Odontosyllis dugesiana 
Odontosyllis enopla 
Odontosyllis fasciata 
Odontosyllis fragilis 
Odontosyllis freycinetensis 
Odontosyllis fulgurans 
Odontosyllis gibba 
Odontosyllis globulocirrata 
Odontosyllis gravelyi 
Odontosyllis gravieri 
Odontosyllis guarauensis 
Odontosyllis guillermoi 
Odontosyllis gymnocephala 
Odontosyllis hartmanae 
Odontosyllis heterodonta 
Odontosyllis hyalina 
Odontosyllis langerhansiaesetosa 
Odontosyllis longicornis 
Odontosyllis longigulata 
Odontosyllis longiseta 
Odontosyllis lucifera 
Odontosyllis luminosa 
Odontosyllis maculata 
Odontosyllis madagascariensis 
Odontosyllis magnanuchalata 
Odontosyllis maorioria 
Odontosyllis marombibooral 
Odontosyllis multidentata 
Odontosyllis multidentatus 
Odontosyllis nans
Odontosyllis octodentata 
Odontosyllis parva 
Odontosyllis pentalineata 
Odontosyllis phosphorans 
Odontosyllis phosphorea 
Odontosyllis polycera 
Odontosyllis polyodonta 
Odontosyllis psammochroma 
Odontosyllis robustus 
Odontosyllis rubens 
Odontosyllis rubrofasciata 
Odontosyllis septemdentata 
Odontosyllis setoensis 
Odontosyllis trilineata 
Odontosyllis twincayensis 
Odontosyllis undecimdonta

References

Annelids